Malus glabrata, commonly known as Biltmore's crabapple, is a species in the genus Malus, in the family Rosaceae. It is grows in South-eastern North America.

References

glabrata
Crabapples